Mandatory Palestine (where "E.Y." indicates ’Eretz Yiśrā’ēl, the Land of Israel) was a geopolitical entity established between 1920 and 1948 in the region of Palestine under the terms of the League of Nations Mandate for Palestine.

During the First World War (1914–1918), an Arab uprising against Ottoman rule and the British Empire's Egyptian Expeditionary Force under General Edmund Allenby drove the Ottoman Turks out of the Levant during the Sinai and Palestine Campaign. The United Kingdom had agreed in the McMahon–Hussein Correspondence that it would honour Arab independence if the Arabs revolted against the Ottoman Turks, but in the end, the United Kingdom and France divided the area under the Sykes–Picot Agreement — an act of betrayal in the eyes of the Arabs.

Further complicating the issue was the Balfour Declaration of 1917, promising British support for a Jewish "national home" in Palestine. At the war's end the British and French formed a joint "Occupied Enemy Territory Administration" in what had been Ottoman Syria. The British achieved legitimacy by obtaining a mandate from the League of Nations in June 1922. One objective of the League of Nations mandate system was to administer areas of the defunct Ottoman Empire "until such time as they are able to stand alone".

During the Mandate, the area saw successive waves of Jewish immigration and the rise of nationalist movements in both the Jewish and Arab communities. Competing interests of the two populations led to the 1936–1939 Arab revolt in Palestine and the 1944–1948 Jewish insurgency in Mandatory Palestine. The United Nations Partition Plan for Palestine to divide the territory into two Arab and Jewish states was passed in November 1947. The 1947–1949 Palestine war ended with the territory of Mandatory Palestine divided among the State of Israel, the Hashemite Kingdom of Jordan, which annexed territory on the West Bank of the Jordan River, and the Kingdom of Egypt, which established the "All-Palestine Protectorate" in the Gaza Strip.

Etymology

The name given to the Mandate's territory was "Palestine", in accordance with local Palestinian Arab and Ottoman usage as well as European traditions. The Mandate charter stipulated that Mandatory Palestine would have three official languages, namely English, Arabic and Hebrew.

In 1926, the British authorities formally decided to use the traditional Arabic and Hebrew equivalents to the English name, i.e. filasţīn (فلسطين) and pālēśtīnā (פּלשׂתינה) respectively. The Jewish leadership proposed that the proper Hebrew name should be ʾĒrēts Yiśrāʾel (ארץ ישׂראל, Land of Israel). The final compromise was to add the initials of the Hebrew proposed name, Alef-Yod, within parenthesis (א״י), whenever the Mandate's name was mentioned in Hebrew in official documents. The Arab leadership saw this compromise as a violation of the mandate terms. Some Arab politicians suggested "Southern Syria" (سوريا الجنوبية) as the Arabic name instead. The British authorities rejected this proposal; according to the Minutes of the Ninth Session of the League of Nations' Permanent Mandates Commission:

The adjective "Mandatory" indicates that the entity's legal status derived from a League of Nations mandate; it is not related to the word's more commonplace usage as a synonym for "compulsory" or "necessary".

History

1920s

Following the arrival of the British, Arab inhabitants established Muslim-Christian Associations in all of the major towns. In 1919 they joined to hold the first Palestine Arab Congress in Jerusalem. It was aimed primarily at representative government and opposition to the Balfour Declaration. Concurrently, the Zionist Commission formed in March 1918 and became active in promoting Zionist objectives in Palestine. On 19 April 1920, elections took place for the Assembly of Representatives of the Palestinian Jewish community.

In March 1920, there was an attack by Arabs on the Jewish village of Tel Hai. In April, there was another attack on Jews, this time in Jerusalem.

In July 1920 a British civilian administration headed by a High Commissioner replaced the military administration. The first High Commissioner, Herbert Samuel, a Zionist and a recent British cabinet minister, arrived in Palestine on 20 June 1920 to take up his appointment from 1 July.

One of the first actions of the newly installed civil administration was to begin granting concessions from the Mandatory government over key economic assets. In 1921 the government granted Pinhas Rutenberg – a Jewish entrepreneur – concessions for the production and distribution of electrical power. Rutenberg soon established an electric company whose shareholders were Zionist organisations, investors, and philanthropists. Palestinian-Arabs saw it as proof that the British intended to favour Zionism. The British administration claimed that electrification would enhance the economic development of the country as a whole, while at the same time securing their commitment to facilitate a Jewish National Home through economicrather than politicalmeans.

In May 1921, almost 100 died in rioting in Jaffa after a disturbance between rival Jewish left-wing protestors was followed by attacks by Arabs on Jews.

Samuel tried to establish self-governing institutions in Palestine, as required by the mandate, but the Arab leadership refused to co-operate with any institution which included Jewish participation. When Grand Mufti of Jerusalem Kamil al-Husayni died in March 1921, High Commissioner Samuel appointed his half-brother Mohammad Amin al-Husseini to the position. Amin al-Husseini, a member of the al-Husayni clan of Jerusalem, was an Arab nationalist and Muslim leader. As Grand Mufti, as well as in the other influential positions that he held during this period, al-Husseini played a key role in violent opposition to Zionism. In 1922, al-Husseini was elected President of the Supreme Muslim Council which had been established by Samuel in December 1921. The Council controlled the Waqf funds, worth annually tens of thousands of pounds and the orphan funds, worth annually about £50,000, as compared to the £600,000 in the Jewish Agency's annual budget. In addition, he controlled the Islamic courts in Palestine. Among other functions, these courts had the power to appoint teachers and preachers.

The 1922 Palestine Order in Council established a Legislative Council, which was to consist of 23 members: 12 elected, 10 appointed, and the High Commissioner. Of the 12 elected members, eight were to be Muslim Arabs, two Christian Arabs, and two Jews. Arabs protested against the distribution of the seats, arguing that as they constituted 88% of the population, having only 43% of the seats was unfair. Elections took place in February and March 1923, but due to an Arab boycott, the results were annulled and a 12-member Advisory Council was established.

At the First World Congress of Jewish Women which was held in Vienna, Austria, 1923, it was decided that: "It appears, therefore, to be the duty of all Jews to co-operate in the social-economic reconstruction of Palestine and to assist in the settlement of Jews in that country."

In October 1923, Britain provided the League of Nations with a report on the administration of Palestine for the period 1920–1922, which covered the period before the mandate.

In August 1929, there were riots in which 250 people died.

1930s: Arab armed insurgency
In 1930, Sheikh Izz ad-Din al-Qassam arrived in Palestine from Syria and organized and established the Black Hand, an anti-Zionist and anti-British militant organization. He recruited and arranged military training for peasants, and by 1935 he had enlisted between 200 and 800 men. They used bombs and firearms against Zionist settlers and vandalized settlers' orchards and British-built railway lines. In November 1935, two of his men engaged in a firefight with a Palestine police patrol hunting fruit thieves and a policeman was killed. Following the incident, British police launched a search and surrounded al-Qassam in a cave near Ya'bad. In the ensuing battle, al-Qassam was killed.

The Arab revolt

The death of al-Qassam on 20 November 1935 generated widespread outrage in the Arab community. Huge crowds accompanied Qassam's body to his grave in Haifa. A few months later, in April 1936, the Arab national general strike broke out. The strike lasted until October 1936, instigated by the Arab Higher Committee, headed by Amin al-Husseini. During the summer of that year, thousands of Jewish-farmed acres and orchards were destroyed. Jewish civilians were attacked and killed, and some Jewish communities, such as those in Beisan (Beit She'an) and Acre, fled to safer areas. The violence abated for about a year while the British sent the Peel Commission to investigate.

During the first stages of the Arab Revolt, due to rivalry between the clans of al-Husseini and Nashashibi among the Palestinian Arabs, Raghib Nashashibi was forced to flee to Egypt after several assassination attempts ordered by Amin al-Husseini.

After the Arab rejection of the Peel Commission recommendation, the revolt resumed in autumn 1937. Over the next 18 months, the British lost Nablus and Hebron. British forces, supported by 6,000 armed Jewish auxiliary police, suppressed the widespread riots with overwhelming force. The British officer Charles Orde Wingate (who supported a Zionist revival for religious reasons) organised Special Night Squads composed of British soldiers and Jewish volunteers such as Yigal Alon, which "scored significant successes against the Arab rebels in the lower Galilee and in the Jezreel valley" by conducting raids on Arab villages. The Jewish militia Irgun used violence also against Arab civilians as "retaliatory acts", attacking marketplaces and buses.

By the time the revolt concluded in March 1939, more than  Arabs, 400 Jews, and 200 British had been killed and at least  Arabs were wounded. In total, 10% of the adult Arab male population was killed, wounded, imprisoned, or exiled. From 1936 to 1945, while establishing collaborative security arrangements with the Jewish Agency, the British confiscated  firearms from Arabs and 521 weapons from Jews.

The attacks on the Jewish population by Arabs had three lasting effects: firstly, they led to the formation and development of Jewish underground militias, primarily the Haganah, which were to prove decisive in 1948. Secondly, it became clear that the two communities could not be reconciled, and the idea of partition was born. Thirdly, the British responded to Arab opposition with the White Paper of 1939, which severely restricted Jewish land purchase and immigration. However, with the advent of World War II, even this reduced immigration quota was not reached. The White Paper policy itself radicalised segments of the Jewish population, who after the war would no longer cooperate with the British.

The revolt had also a negative effect on Palestinian Arab leadership, social cohesion, and military capabilities and contributed to the outcome of the 1948 War because "when the Palestinians faced their most fateful challenge in 1947–49, they were still suffering from the British repression of 1936–39, and were in effect without a unified leadership. Indeed, it might be argued that they were virtually without any leadership at all."

Partition proposals

In 1937, the Peel Commission proposed a partition between a small Jewish state, whose Arab population would have to be transferred, and an Arab state to be attached to Jordan. The proposal was rejected outright by the Arabs. The two main Jewish leaders, Chaim Weizmann and David Ben-Gurion, had convinced the Zionist Congress to approve equivocally the Peel recommendations as a basis for more negotiation. In a letter to his son in October 1937, Ben-Gurion explained that partition would be a first step to "possession of the land as a whole". The same sentiment was recorded by Ben-Gurion on other occasions, such as at a meeting of the Jewish Agency executive in June 1938, as well as by Chaim Weizmann.

Following the London Conference (1939) the British Government published a White Paper which proposed a limit to Jewish immigration from Europe, restrictions on Jewish land purchases, and a program for creating an independent state to replace the Mandate within ten years. This was seen by the Yishuv as betrayal of the mandatory terms, especially in light of the increasing persecution of Jews in Europe. In response, Zionists organised Aliyah Bet, a program of illegal immigration into Palestine. Lehi, a small group of extremist Zionists, staged armed attacks on British authorities in Palestine. However, the Jewish Agency, which represented the mainstream Zionist leadership and most of the Jewish population, still hoped to persuade Britain to allow resumed Jewish immigration, and cooperated with Britain in World War II.

World War II

Allied and Axis activity

On 10 June 1940, Italy declared war on the British Commonwealth and sided with Germany. Within a month, the Italians attacked Palestine from the air, bombing Tel Aviv and Haifa, inflicting multiple casualties.

In 1942, there was a period of great concern for the Yishuv, when the forces of German General Erwin Rommel advanced east across North Africa towards the Suez Canal, raising fear that they would conquer Palestine. This period was referred to as the "200 days of dread". This event was the direct cause for the founding, with British support, of the Palmach – a highly trained regular unit belonging to Haganah (a paramilitary group composed mostly of reserves).

As in most of the Arab world, there was no unanimity amongst the Palestinian Arabs as to their position regarding the belligerents in World War II. A number of leaders and public figures saw an Axis victory as the likely outcome and a way of securing Palestine back from the Zionists and the British. Even though Arabs were not highly regarded by Nazi racial theory, the Nazis encouraged Arab support as a counter to British hegemony. On the anniversary of the Balfour Declaration in 1943, SS-Reichsfuehrer Heinrich Himmler and Foreign Minister Joachim von Ribbentrop sent telegrams of support for the Grand Mufti of Jerusalem, Mohammad Amin al-Husseini to read out for a radio broadcast to a rally of supporters in Berlin. On the other hand, as many as 12,000 Palestinian Arabs, with the endorsement of many prominent figures such as mayors of Nablus and Gaza and media such as "Radio Palestine" and the prominent Jafa-based Falastin newspaper at the time, volunteered to join and fight for the British, with many serving in units that also included Jews from Palestine. 120 Palestinian women also served as part of the "Auxiliary Territorial Service". However, this history has been less studied, as Israeli sources put more focus in studying the role played by Jewish soldiers, and Palestinian sources were wary of glorifying the idea of cooperating with the British only a few years after the brutal British suppression of the 1936–1939 Arab revolt.

Mobilisation

On 3 July 1944, the British government consented to the establishment of a Jewish Brigade, with hand-picked Jewish and also non-Jewish senior officers. On 20 September 1944, an official communiqué by the War Office announced the formation of the Jewish Brigade Group of the British Army. The Jewish brigade then was stationed in Tarvisio, near the border triangle of Italy, Yugoslavia, and Austria, where it played a key role in the Berihah's efforts to help Jews escape Europe for Palestine, a role many of its members would continue after the brigade was disbanded. Among its projects was the education and care of the Selvino children. Later, veterans of the Jewish Brigade became key participants of the new State of Israel's Israel Defense Forces.

From the Palestine Regiment, two platoons, one Jewish, under the command of Brigadier Ernest Benjamin, and another Arab were sent to join Allied forces on the Italian Front, having taken part in the final offensive there.

Besides Jews and Arabs from Palestine, in total by mid-1944 the British had assembled a multiethnic force consisting of volunteer European Jewish refugees (from German-occupied countries), Yemenite Jews and Abyssinian Jews.

The Holocaust and immigration quotas
In 1939, as a consequence of the White Paper of 1939, the British reduced the number of immigrants allowed into Palestine. World War II and the Holocaust started shortly thereafter and once the 15,000 annual quota was exceeded, Jews fleeing Nazi persecution were interned in detention camps or deported to places such as Mauritius.

Starting in 1939, a clandestine immigration effort called Aliya Bet was spearheaded by an organisation called Mossad LeAliyah Bet. Tens of thousands of European Jews escaped the Nazis in boats and small ships headed for Palestine. The last refugee boats to try to reach Palestine during the war were the Bulbul,  and Morina in August 1944. A Soviet submarine sank the motor schooner Mefküre by torpedo and shellfire and machine-gunned survivors in the water, killing between 300 and 400 refugees. Illegal immigration resumed after World War II.

After the war 250,000 Jewish refugees were stranded in displaced persons (DP) camps in Europe. Despite the pressure of world opinion, in particular the repeated requests of US President Harry S. Truman and the recommendations of the Anglo-American Committee of Inquiry that 100,000 Jews be immediately granted entry to Palestine, the British maintained the ban on immigration.

Beginning of Zionist insurgency

The Jewish Lehi (Fighters for the Freedom of Israel) and Irgun (National Military Organisation) movements initiated violent uprisings against the British Mandate in the 1940s. On 6 November 1944, Eliyahu Hakim and Eliyahu Bet Zuri (members of Lehi) assassinated Lord Moyne in Cairo. Moyne was the British Minister of State for the Middle East and the assassination is said by some to have turned British Prime Minister Winston Churchill against the Zionist cause. After the assassination of Lord Moyne, the Haganah kidnapped, interrogated, and turned over to the British many members of the Irgun ("The Hunting Season"), and the Jewish Agency Executive decided on a series of measures against "terrorist organisations" in Palestine. Irgun ordered its members not to resist or retaliate with violence, so as to prevent a civil war.

After World War II: Insurgency and the Partition Plan

The three main Jewish underground forces later united to form the Jewish Resistance Movement and carry out several attacks and bombings against the British administration. In 1946, the Irgun blew up the King David Hotel in Jerusalem, the southern wing of which was the headquarters of the British administration, killing 92 people. Following the bombing, the British Government began interning illegal Jewish immigrants in Cyprus. In 1948 the Lehi assassinated the UN mediator Count Bernadotte in Jerusalem. Yitzak Shamir, future prime minister of Israel was one of the conspirators.

The negative publicity resulting from the situation in Palestine caused the Mandate to become widely unpopular in Britain, and caused the United States Congress to delay granting the British vital loans for reconstruction. The British Labour party had promised before its election in 1945 to allow mass Jewish migration into Palestine but reneged on this promise once in office. Anti-British Jewish militancy increased and the situation required the presence of over 100,000 British troops in the country. Following the Acre Prison Break and the retaliatory hanging of British Sergeants by the Irgun, the British announced their desire to terminate the mandate and to withdraw by no later than the beginning of August 1948.

The Anglo-American Committee of Inquiry in 1946 was a joint attempt by Britain and the United States to agree on a policy regarding the admission of Jews to Palestine. In April, the Committee reported that its members had arrived at a unanimous decision. The Committee approved the American recommendation of the immediate acceptance of 100,000 Jewish refugees from Europe into Palestine. It also recommended that there be no Arab, and no Jewish State. The Committee stated that "in order to dispose, once and for all, of the exclusive claims of Jews and Arabs to Palestine, we regard it as essential that a clear statement of principle should be made that Jew shall not dominate Arab and Arab shall not dominate Jew in Palestine". US President Harry S Truman angered the British Government by issuing a statement supporting the 100,000 refugees but refusing to acknowledge the rest of the committee's findings. Britain had asked for U.S assistance in implementing the recommendations. The US War Department had said earlier that to assist Britain in maintaining order against an Arab revolt, an open-ended US commitment of 300,000 troops would be necessary. The immediate admission of 100,000 new Jewish immigrants would almost certainly have provoked an Arab uprising.

These events were the decisive factors that forced Britain to announce their desire to terminate the Palestine Mandate and place the Question of Palestine before the United Nations, the successor to the League of Nations. The UN created UNSCOP (the UN Special Committee on Palestine) on 15 May 1947, with representatives from 11 countries. UNSCOP conducted hearings and made a general survey of the situation in Palestine, and issued its report on 31 August. Seven members (Canada, Czechoslovakia, Guatemala, Netherlands, Peru, Sweden, and Uruguay) recommended the creation of independent Arab and Jewish states, with Jerusalem to be placed under international administration. Three members (India, Iran, and Yugoslavia) supported the creation of a single federal state containing both Jewish and Arab constituent states. Australia abstained.

On 29 November 1947, the UN General Assembly, voting 33 to 13, with 10 abstentions, adopted a resolution recommending the adoption and implementation of the Plan of Partition with Economic Union as Resolution 181 (II), while making some adjustments to the boundaries between the two states proposed by it. The division was to take effect on the date of British withdrawal. The partition plan required that the proposed states grant full civil rights to all people within their borders, regardless of race, religion or gender. The UN General Assembly is only granted the power to make recommendations; therefore, UNGAR 181 was not legally binding. Both the US and the Soviet Union supported the resolution. Haiti, Liberia, and the Philippines changed their votes at the last moment after concerted pressure from the US and from Zionist organisations. The five members of the Arab League, who were voting members at the time, voted against the Plan.

The Jewish Agency, which was the Jewish state-in-formation, accepted the plan, and nearly all the Jews in Palestine rejoiced at the news.

The partition plan was rejected by Palestinian Arab leadership and by most of the Arab population. Meeting in Cairo on November and December 1947, the Arab League then adopted a series of resolutions endorsing a military solution to the conflict.

Britain announced that it would accept the partition plan, but refused to enforce it, arguing it was not accepted by the Arabs. Britain also refused to share the administration of Palestine with the UN Palestine Commission during the transitional period. In September 1947, the British government announced that the Mandate for Palestine would end at midnight on 14 May 1948.

Some Jewish organisations also opposed the proposal. Irgun leader Menachem Begin announced, "The partition of the Homeland is illegal. It will never be recognised. The signature by institutions and individuals of the partition agreement is invalid. It will not bind the Jewish people. Jerusalem was and will forever be our capital. Eretz Israel will be restored to the people of Israel. All of it. And for ever."

Termination of the mandate

When the UK announced the independence of Transjordan in 1946, the final Assembly of the League of Nations and the General Assembly both adopted resolutions welcoming the news. The Jewish Agency objected, claiming that Transjordan was an integral part of Palestine, and that according to Article 80 of the UN Charter, the Jewish people had a secured interest in its territory.

During the General Assembly deliberations on Palestine, there were suggestions that it would be desirable to incorporate part of Transjordan's territory into the proposed Jewish state. A few days before the adoption of Resolution 181 (II) on 29 November 1947, US Secretary of State Marshall noted frequent references had been made by the Ad Hoc Committee regarding the desirability of the Jewish State having both the Negev and an "outlet to the Red Sea and the Port of Aqaba". According to John Snetsinger, Chaim Weizmann visited President Truman on 19 November 1947 and said it was imperative that the Negev and Port of Aqaba be within the Jewish state. Truman telephoned the US delegation to the UN and told them he supported Weizmann's position. However, the Trans-Jordan memorandum excluded territories of the Emirate of Transjordan from any Jewish settlement.

Immediately after the UN resolution, the 1947-1948 Civil War in Mandatory Palestine broke out between the Arab and Jewish communities, and British authority began to break down. On 16 December 1947, the Palestine Police Force withdrew from the Tel Aviv area, home to more than half the Jewish population, and turned over responsibility for the maintenance of law and order to Jewish police. As the civil war raged on, British military forces gradually withdrew from Palestine, although they occasionally intervened in favour of either side. Many of these areas became war zones. The British maintained strong presences in Jerusalem and Haifa, even as Jerusalem came under siege by Arab forces and became the scene of fierce fighting, though the British occasionally intervened in the fighting, largely to secure their evacuation routes, including by proclaiming martial law and enforcing truces. The Palestine Police Force was largely inoperative, and government services such as social welfare, water supplies, and postal services were withdrawn. In March 1948, all British judges in Palestine were sent back to Britain. In April 1948, the British withdrew from most of Haifa but retained an enclave in the port area to be used in the evacuation of British forces, and retained RAF Ramat David, an airbase close to Haifa, to cover their retreat, leaving behind a volunteer police force to maintain order. The city was quickly captured by the Haganah in the Battle of Haifa. After the victory, British forces in Jerusalem announced that they had no intention of overseeing any local administration but also that they would not permit actions that would hamper the safe and orderly withdrawal of their forces; military courts would try anybody who interfered. Although by this time British authority in most of Palestine had broken down, with most of the country in the hands of Jews or Arabs, the British air and sea blockade of Palestine remained in place. Although Arab volunteers were able to cross the borders between Palestine and the surrounding Arab states to join the fighting, the British did not allow the regular armies of the surrounding Arab states to cross into Palestine.

The British had notified the UN of their intent to terminate the mandate not later than 1 August 1948. However, early in 1948, the United Kingdom announced its firm intention to end its mandate in Palestine on 15 May. In response, President Harry S Truman made a statement on 25 March proposing UN trusteeship rather than partition, stating that "unfortunately, it has become clear that the partition plan cannot be carried out at this time by peaceful means... unless emergency action is taken, there will be no public authority in Palestine on that date capable of preserving law and order. Violence and bloodshed will descend upon the Holy Land. Large-scale fighting among the people of that country will be the inevitable result". The British Parliament passed the necessary legislation to terminate the Mandate with the Palestine Bill, which received Royal assent on 29 April 1948.

By 14 May 1948, the only British forces remaining in Palestine were in the Haifa area and in Jerusalem. On that same day, the British garrison in Jerusalem withdrew, and High Commissioner Alan Cunningham left the city for Haifa, where he was to leave the country by sea. The Jewish leadership, led by future Prime Minister, David Ben-Gurion, declared the establishment of a Jewish State in Eretz-Israel, to be known as the State of Israel, on the afternoon of 14 May 1948 (5 Iyar 5708 in the Hebrew calendar), to come into force at midnight of that day. On the same day, the Provisional Government of Israel asked the US Government for recognition, on the frontiers specified in the UN Plan for Partition. The United States immediately replied, recognizing "the provisional government as the de facto authority".

At midnight on 14/15 May 1948, the Mandate for Palestine expired and the State of Israel came into being. The Palestine Government formally ceased to exist, the status of British forces still in the process of withdrawal from Haifa changed to occupiers of foreign territory, the Palestine Police Force formally stood down and was disbanded, with the remaining personnel evacuated alongside British military forces, the British blockade of Palestine was lifted, and all those who had been Palestinian citizens ceased to be British protected persons, with Mandatory Palestine passports no longer giving British protection. The 1948 Palestinian exodus took place both before and after the end of the Mandate.

Over the next few days, approximately 700 Lebanese, 1,876 Syrian, 4,000 Iraqi, and 2,800 Egyptian troops crossed over the borders into Palestine, starting the 1948 Arab–Israeli War. Around 4,500 Transjordanian troops, commanded partly by 38 British officers who had resigned their commissions in the British army only weeks earlier, including overall commander, General John Bagot Glubb, entered the Corpus separatum region encompassing Jerusalem and its environs (in response to the Haganah's Operation Kilshon) and moved into areas designated as part of the Arab state by the UN partition plan. The war, which was to last until 1949, would see Israel expand to encompass about 78% of the territory of the former British Mandate, with Jordan seizing and subsequently annexing the West Bank and Egypt seizing the Gaza Strip. With the end of the Mandate, the remaining British troops in Israel were concentrated in an enclave in the Haifa port area through which they were being withdrawn and at RAF Ramat David, which was maintained to cover the withdrawal. The British handed over RAF Ramat David to the Israelis on 26 May and on 30 June, the last British troops were evacuated from Haifa. The British flag was lowered from the administrative building of the Port of Haifa and the Israeli flag was raised in its place, and the Haifa port area was formally handed over to the Israeli authorities in a ceremony.

Politics

Palestinian Arab community

The resolution of the San Remo Conference contained a safeguarding clause for the existing rights of the non-Jewish communities. The conference accepted the terms of the Mandate with reference to Palestine, on the understanding that there was inserted in the memorandum a legal undertaking by the Mandatory Power that it would not involve the surrender of the rights hitherto enjoyed by the non-Jewish communities in Palestine. The draft mandates for Mesopotamia and Palestine, and all of the post-war peace treaties contained clauses for the protection of religious groups and minorities. The mandates invoked the compulsory jurisdiction of the Permanent Court of International Justice in the event of any disputes.

Article 62 (LXII) of the Treaty of Berlin, 13 July 1878 dealt with religious freedom and civil and political rights in all parts of the Ottoman Empire. The guarantees have frequently been referred to as "religious rights" or "minority rights". However, the guarantees included a prohibition against discrimination in civil and political matters. Difference of religion could not be alleged against any person as a ground for exclusion or incapacity in matters relating to the enjoyment of civil or political rights, admission to public employments, functions, and honours, or the exercise of the various professions and industries, "in any locality whatsoever".

A legal analysis performed by the International Court of Justice noted that the Covenant of the League of Nations had provisionally recognised the communities of Palestine as independent nations. The mandate simply marked a transitory period, with the aim and object of leading the mandated territory to become an independent self-governing State. Judge Higgins explained that the Palestinian people are entitled to their territory, to exercise self-determination, and to have their own State." The Court said that specific guarantees regarding freedom of movement and access to the Holy Sites contained in the Treaty of Berlin (1878) had been preserved under the terms of the Palestine Mandate and a chapter of the United Nations Partition Plan for Palestine.

According to historian Rashid Khalidi, the mandate ignored the political rights of the Arabs. The Arab leadership repeatedly pressed the British to grant them national and political rights, such as representative government, over Jewish national and political rights in the remaining 23% of the Mandate of Palestine which the British had set aside for a Jewish homeland. The Arabs reminded the British of President Wilson's Fourteen Points and British promises during the First World War. The British however made acceptance of the terms of the mandate a precondition for any change in the constitutional position of the Arabs. A legislative council was proposed in The Palestine Order in Council, of 1922 which implemented the terms of the mandate. It stated that: "No Ordinance shall be passed which shall be in any way repugnant to or inconsistent with the provisions of the Mandate." For the Arabs, this decree was unacceptable, akin to "self murder". As a result, the Arabs boycotted the elections to the Council held in 1923, which were subsequently annulled. During the interwar period, the British rejected the principle of majority rule or any other measure that would give Arabs control of the government.

The terms of the mandate required the establishment of self-governing institutions in both Palestine and Transjordan. In 1947, Foreign Secretary Bevin admitted that during the previous twenty-five years the British had done their best to further the legitimate aspirations of the Jewish communities without prejudicing the interests of the Arabs, but had failed to "secure the development of self-governing institutions" in accordance with the terms of the Mandate.

Palestinian Arab leadership and national aspirations

Under the British Mandate, the office of "Mufti of Jerusalem", traditionally limited in authority and geographical scope, was refashioned into that of "Grand Mufti of Palestine". Furthermore, a Supreme Muslim Council (SMC) was established and given various duties, such as the administration of religious endowments and the appointment of religious judges and local muftis. In Ottoman times, these duties had been fulfilled by the bureaucracy in Istanbul. In dealings with the Palestinian Arabs, the British negotiated with the elite rather than the middle or lower classes. They chose Hajj Amin al-Husseini to become Grand Mufti, although he was young and had received the fewest votes from Jerusalem's Islamic leaders. One of the mufti's rivals, Raghib Bey al-Nashashibi, had already been appointed mayor of Jerusalem in 1920, replacing Musa Kazim, whom the British removed after the Nabi Musa riots of 1920, during which he exhorted the crowd to give their blood for Palestine. During the entire Mandate period, but especially during the latter half, the rivalry between the mufti and al-Nashashibi dominated Palestinian politics. Khalidi ascribes the failure of the Palestinian leaders to enroll mass support to the fact that they had been part of the ruling elite and accustomed to their commands being obeyed; thus, the idea of mobilising the masses was unknown to them.

On the Husseini-Nashashibi rivalry, an editorial in the Arabic-language Falastin newspaper in the 1920s commented: 

There had already been rioting and attacks on and massacres of Jews in 1921 and 1929. During the 1930s, Palestinian Arab popular discontent with Jewish immigration grew. In the late 1920s and early 1930s, several factions of Palestinian society, especially from the younger generation, became impatient with the internecine divisions and ineffectiveness of the Palestinian elite and engaged in grass-roots anti-British and anti-Zionist activism, organised by groups such as the Young Men's Muslim Association. There was also support for the radical nationalist Independence Party (Hizb al-Istiqlal), which called for a boycott of the British in the manner of the Indian Congress Party. Some took to the hills to fight the British and the Jews. Most of these initiatives were contained and defeated by notables in the pay of the Mandatory Administration, particularly the mufti and his cousin Jamal al-Husseini. A six-month general strike in 1936 marked the start of the great Arab Revolt.

Jewish community

The conquest of the Ottoman Syria by the British forces in 1917 found a mixed community in the region, with Palestine, the southern part of the Ottoman Syria, containing a mixed population of Muslims, Christians, Jews and Druze. In this period, the Jewish community (Yishuv) in Palestine was composed of traditional Jewish communities in cities (the Old Yishuv), which had existed for centuries, and the newly established agricultural Zionist communities (the New Yishuv), established since the 1870s. With the establishment of the Mandate, the Jewish community in Palestine formed the Zionist Commission to represent its interests.

In 1929, the Jewish Agency for Palestine took over from the Zionist Commission its representative functions and administration of the Jewish community. During the Mandate period, the Jewish Agency was a quasi-governmental organisation that served the administrative needs of the Jewish community. Its leadership was elected by Jews from all over the world by proportional representation. The Jewish Agency was charged with facilitating Jewish immigration to Palestine, land purchase and planning the general policies of the Zionist leadership. It ran schools and hospitals, and formed the Haganah. The British authorities offered to create a similar Arab Agency but this offer was rejected by Arab leaders.

In response to numerous Arab attacks on Jewish communities, the Haganah, a Jewish paramilitary organisation, was formed on 15 June 1920 to defend Jewish residents. Tensions led to widespread violent disturbances on several occasions, notably in 1921 (see Jaffa riots), 1929 (primarily violent attacks by Arabs on Jewssee 1929 Hebron massacre) and 1936–1939. Beginning in 1936, Jewish groups such as Etzel (Irgun) and Lehi (Stern Gang) conducted campaigns of violence against British military and Arab targets.

Jewish immigration

During the Mandate, the Yishuv or Jewish community in Palestine, grew from one-sixth to almost one-third of the population. According to official records, 367,845 Jews and 33,304 non-Jews immigrated legally between 1920 and 1945. It was estimated that another 50–60,000 Jews and a marginal number of Arabs, the latter mostly on a seasonal basis, immigrated illegally during this period. Immigration accounted for most of the increase of Jewish population, while the non-Jewish population increase was largely natural. Of the Jewish immigrants, in 1939 most had come from Germany and Czechoslovakia, but in 1940–1944 most came from Romania and Poland, with an additional 3,530 immigrants arriving from Yemen during the same period.

Initially, Jewish immigration to Palestine met little opposition from the Palestinian Arabs. However, as anti-Semitism grew in Europe during the late 19th and early 20th centuries, Jewish immigration (mostly from Europe) to Palestine began to increase markedly. Combined with the growth of Arab nationalism in the region and increasing anti-Jewish sentiments the growth of Jewish population created much Arab resentment. The British government placed limitations on Jewish immigration to Palestine. These quotas were controversial, particularly in the latter years of British rule, and both Arabs and Jews disliked the policy, each for their own reasons.

Jewish immigrants were to be afforded Palestinian citizenship:

Jewish national home
In 1919, the general secretary (and future President) of the Zionist Organisation, Nahum Sokolow, published History of Zionism (1600–1918). He also represented the Zionist Organisation at the Paris Peace Conference.

One of the objectives of British administration was to give effect to the Balfour Declaration, which was also set out in the preamble of the mandate, as follows:

The United Nations Special Committee on Palestine said the Jewish National Home, which derived from the formulation of Zionist aspirations in the 1897 Basle program has provoked many discussions concerning its meaning, scope and legal character, especially since it had no known legal connotation and there are no precedents in international law for its interpretation. It was used in the Balfour Declaration and in the Mandate, both of which promised the establishment of a "Jewish National Home" without, however, defining its meaning. A statement on "British Policy in Palestine", issued on 3 June 1922 by the Colonial Office, placed a restrictive construction upon the Balfour Declaration. The statement included "the disappearance or subordination of the Arabic population, language or customs in Palestine" or "the imposition of Jewish nationality upon the inhabitants of Palestine as a whole", and made it clear that in the eyes of the mandatory Power, the Jewish National Home was to be founded in Palestine and not that Palestine as a whole was to be converted into a Jewish National Home. The Committee noted that the construction, which restricted considerably the scope of the National Home, was made prior to the confirmation of the Mandate by the Council of the League of Nations and was formally accepted at the time by the Executive of the Zionist Organisation.

In March 1930, Lord Passfield, the Secretary of State for the Colonies, had written a Cabinet Paper which said:

The League of Nations Permanent Mandates Commission took the position that the Mandate contained a dual obligation. In 1932 the Mandates Commission questioned the representative of the Mandatory on the demands made by the Arab population regarding the establishment of self-governing institutions, in accordance with various articles of the mandate, and in particular Article 2. The chairman noted that "under the terms of the same article, the mandatory Power had long since set up the Jewish National Home".

In 1937, the Peel Commission, a British Royal Commission headed by Earl Peel, proposed solving the Arab–Jewish conflict by partitioning Palestine into two states. The two main Jewish leaders, Chaim Weizmann and David Ben-Gurion, had convinced the Zionist Congress to approve equivocally the Peel recommendations as a basis for more negotiation. The US Consul General at Jerusalem told the State Department that the Mufti had refused the principle of partition and declined to consider it. The Consul said that the Emir Abdullah urged acceptance on the ground that realities must be faced, but wanted modification of the proposed boundaries and Arab administrations in the neutral enclave. The Consul also noted that Nashashibi sidestepped the principle, but was willing to negotiate for favourable modifications.

A collection of private correspondence published by David Ben Gurion contained a letter written in 1937 which explained that he was in favour of partition because he didn't envision a partial Jewish state as the end of the process. Ben Gurion wrote "What we want is not that the country be united and whole, but that the united and whole country be Jewish." He explained that a first-class Jewish army would permit Zionists to settle in the rest of the country with or without the consent of the Arabs. Benny Morris said that both Chaim Weizmann and David Ben Gurion saw partition as a stepping stone to further expansion and the eventual takeover of the whole of Palestine. Former Israeli Foreign Minister and historian Schlomo Ben Ami writes that 1937 was the same year that the "Field Battalions" under Yitzhak Sadeh wrote the "Avner Plan", which anticipated and laid the groundwork for what would become in 1948, Plan D. It envisioned going far beyond any boundaries contained in the existing partition proposals and planned the conquest of the Galilee, the West Bank, and Jerusalem.

In 1942, the Biltmore Program was adopted as the platform of the World Zionist Organisation. It demanded "that Palestine be established as a Jewish Commonwealth".

In 1946 an Anglo-American Committee of Inquiry noted that the demand for a Jewish State went beyond the obligations of either the Balfour Declaration or the Mandate and had been expressly disowned by the Chairman of the Jewish Agency as recently as 1932. The Jewish Agency subsequently refused to accept the subsequent Morrison-Grady Plan as the basis for discussion. A spokesman for the agency, Eliahu Epstein, told the US State Department that the Agency could not attend the London conference if the Grady-Morrison proposal was on the agenda. He stated that the Agency was unwilling to be placed in a position where it might have to compromise between the Grady-Morrison proposals on the one hand and its own partition plan on the other. He stated that the Agency had accepted partition as the solution for Palestine which it favoured.

Land ownership

After transition to the British rule, much of the agricultural land in Palestine (about one third of the whole territory) was still owned by the same landowners as under Ottoman rule, mostly powerful Arab clans and local Muslim sheikhs. Other lands had been held by foreign Christian organisations (most notably the Greek Orthodox Church), as well as Jewish private and Zionist organisations, and to lesser degree by small minorities of Baháʼís, Samaritans and Circassians.

Official statistics show that Jews privately and collectively owned , or 5.23% of Palestine's total in 1945. The Jewish owned agricultural land was largely located in the Galilee and along the coastal plain. Estimates of the total volume of land that Jews had purchased by 15 May 1948 are complicated by illegal and unregistered land transfers, as well as by the lack of data on land concessions from the Palestine administration after 31 March 1936. According to Avneri, Jews held  of land in 1947, or 6.94% of the total. According to Fischbach, by 1948, Jews and Jewish companies owned 20% percent of all cultivable land in the country.

According to Clifford A. Wright, by the end of the British Mandate period in 1948, Jewish farmers cultivated 425,450 dunams of land, while Palestinian farmers had 5,484,700 dunams of land under cultivation. The 1945 UN estimate shows that Arab ownership of arable land was on average 68% of a district, ranging from 15% ownership in the Beer-Sheba district to 99% ownership in the Ramallah district. These data cannot be fully understood without comparing them to those of neighbouring countries: in Iraq, for instance, still in 1951 only 0.3 per cent of registered land (or 50 per cent of the total amount) was categorised as 'private property'.

Land ownership by district
The following table shows the 1945 land ownership of mandatory Palestine by district:

Land ownership by corporation
The table below shows the land ownership of Palestine by large Jewish Corporations (in square kilometres) on 31 December 1945.

Land ownership by type
The land owned privately and collectively by Jews, Arabs and other non-Jews can be classified as urban, rural built-on, cultivable (farmed), and uncultivable. The following chart shows the ownership by Jews, Arabs and other non-Jews in each of the categories.

List of Mandatory land laws

 Land Transfer Ordinance of 1920
 1926 Correction of Land Registers Ordinance
 Land Settlement Ordinance of 1928
 Land Transfer Regulations of 1940

In February 1940, the British Government of Palestine promulgated the Land Transfer Regulations which divided Palestine into three regions with different restrictions on land sales applying to each. In Zone "A", which included the hill-country of Judea as a whole, certain areas in the Jaffa sub-District, and in the Gaza District, and the northern part of the Beersheba sub-District, new agreements for sale of land other than to a Palestinian Arab were forbidden without the High Commissioner's permission. In Zone "B", which included the Jezreel Valley, eastern Galilee, a parcel of coastal plain south of Haifa, a region northeast of the Gaza District, and the southern part of the Beersheba sub-District, sale of land by a Palestinian Arab was forbidden except to a Palestinian Arab with similar exceptions. In the "free zone", which consisted of Haifa Bay, the coastal plain from Zikhron Ya'akov to Yibna, and the neighborhood of Jerusalem, there were no restrictions. The reason given for the regulations was that the Mandatory was required to "ensur[e] that the rights and positions of other sections of the population are not prejudiced", and an assertion that "such transfers of land must be restricted if Arab cultivators are to maintain their existing standard of life and a considerable landless Arab population is not soon to be created"

Demographics

British censuses and estimations

A discrepancy between the two censuses and records of births, deaths and immigration, led the authors of the second census to postulate the illegal immigration of about 9,000 Jews and 4,000 Arabs during the intervening years.

There were no further censuses but statistics were maintained by counting births, deaths and migration. By the end of 1936 the total population was approximately 1,300,000, the Jews being estimated at 384,000. The Arabs had also increased their numbers rapidly, mainly as a result of the cessation of the military conscription imposed on the country by the Ottoman Empire, the campaign against malaria and a general improvement in health services. In absolute figures their increase exceeded that of the Jewish population, but proportionally, the latter had risen from 13 per cent of the total population at the census of 1922 to nearly 30 per cent at the end of 1936.

Some components such as illegal immigration could only be estimated approximately. The White Paper of 1939, which placed immigration restrictions on Jews, stated that the Jewish population "has risen to some " and was "approaching a third of the entire population of the country".

By district

The following table gives the religious demography of each of the 16 districts of the Mandate in 1945.

Government and institutions

Under the terms of the August 1922 Palestine Order in Council, the Mandate territory was divided into administrative regions known as districts and administer by the office of the British High Commissioner for Palestine.

Britain continued the millet system of the Ottoman Empire whereby all matters of a religious nature and personal status were within the jurisdiction of Muslim courts and the courts of other recognised religions, called confessional communities. The High Commissioner established the Orthodox Rabbinate and retained a modified millet system which only recognised eleven religious communities: Muslims, Jews and nine Christian denominations (none of which were Christian Protestant churches). All those who were not members of these recognised communities were excluded from the millet arrangement. As a result, there was no possibility, for example, of marriages between confessional communities, and there were no civil marriages. Personal contacts between communities were nominal.

Apart from the Religious Courts, the judicial system was modelled on the British one, having a High Court with appellate jurisdiction and the power of review over the Central Court and the Central Criminal Court. 
The five consecutive Chief Justices were:
Thomas Haycraft (1921–1927)
Michael McDonnell (1927–1936)
Harry Herbert Trusted (1936–1941) (afterwards Chief Justice of the Federated Malay States, 1941)
Frederick Gordon-Smith (1941–1944)
William James Fitzgerald (1944–1948)

The local newspaper The Palestine Post was founded in 1932 by Gershon Agron. In 1950, its name was changed to The Jerusalem Post. In 1923, Pinhas Rutenberg founded the Palestine Electric Company (to become the Israel Electric Corporation in 1961).

Economy

Between 1922 and 1947, the annual growth rate of the Jewish sector of the economy was 13.2%, mainly due to immigration and foreign capital, while that of the Arab was 6.5%. Per capita, these figures were 4.8% and 3.6% respectively. By 1936, Jews earned 2.6 times as much as Arabs. Compared to Arabs in other countries, Palestinian Arabs earned slightly more.

The Jaffa Electric Company was founded in 1923 by Pinhas Rutenberg, and was later absorbed into a newly created Palestine Electric Corporation; the First Jordan Hydro-Electric Power House was opened in 1933. Palestine Airways was founded in 1934, Angel Bakeries in 1927, and the Tnuva dairy in 1926. Electric current mainly flowed to Jewish industry, following it to its nestled locations in Tel Aviv and Haifa. Although Tel Aviv had by far more workshops and factories, the demand for electric power for industry was roughly the same for both cities by the early 1930s.

The country's largest industrial zone was in Haifa, where many housing projects were built for employees.

On the scale of the UN Human Development Index determined for around 1939, of 36 countries, Palestinian Jews were placed 15th, Palestinian Arabs 30th, Egypt 33rd and Turkey 35th. The Jews in Palestine were mainly urban, 76.2% in 1942, while the Arabs were mainly rural, 68.3% in 1942. Overall, Khalidi concludes that Palestinian Arab society, while overmatched by the Yishuv, was as advanced as any other Arab society in the region and considerably more than several.

Education
Under the British Mandate, the country developed economically and culturally. In 1919 the Jewish community founded a centralised Hebrew school system, and the following year established the Assembly of Representatives, the Jewish National Council and the Histadrut labour federation. The Technion university was founded in 1924, and the Hebrew University of Jerusalem in 1925.

Literacy rates in 1932 were 86% for the Jews compared to 22% for the Palestinian Arabs, but Arab literacy rates steadily increased thereafter. By comparison, Palestinian Arab literacy rates were higher than those of Egypt and Turkey, but lower than in Lebanon.

Gallery

See also
 Ernest Bevin
 Herbert Dowbiggin (1880–1966) – police expert
 Faisal–Weizmann Agreement (1919)
 Haavara Agreement (1933)
 High Commissioners for Palestine and Transjordan
 Israeli Declaration of Independence
 List of post offices in the British Mandate of Palestine
 Mandatory Palestine passport
 Museum of Underground Prisoners
 Palestinian Citizenship Order, 1925
 Palestine Command
 Palestine pound
 Postage stamps and postal history of Palestine
 Russian Compound
 Charles Tegart (1881–1946) – police expert. The Tegart police forts are named after him.
 Tegart's Wall
 The Sergeants affair
 Liberal Party (Mandatory Palestine)

Notes

References

Bibliography

Further reading

 Bar-Yosef, Eitan. "Bonding with the British: Colonial Nostalgia and the Idealization of Mandatory Palestine in Israeli Literature and Culture after 1967." Jewish Social Studies 22.3 (2017): 1–37. online 
 Cohen, Michael J. Britain's Moment in Palestine: Retrospect and Perspectives, 1917–1948 (2014)
 El-Eini, Roza. Mandated landscape: British imperial rule in Palestine 1929–1948 (Routledge, 2004).
 Galnoor, Itzhak. Partition of Palestine, The: Decision Crossroads in the Zionist Movement (SUNY Press, 2012).
 Hanna, Paul Lamont, "British Policy in Palestine ", Washington, D.C., American Council on Public Affairs, (1942)
 Harris, Kenneth.  Attlee (1982) pp 388–400.
 Kamel, Lorenzo. "Whose Land? Land Tenure in Late Nineteenth- and Early Twentieth-Century Palestine", "British Journal of Middle Eastern studies" (April 2014), 41, 2, pp. 230–242.
 Miller, Rory, ed. Britain, Palestine and Empire: The Mandate Years (2010)
 Morgan, Kenneth O.The People's Peace: British history 1945 – 1990 (1992) 49–52. 
 Ravndal, Ellen Jenny. "Exit Britain: British Withdrawal From the Palestine Mandate in the Early Cold War, 1947–1948," Diplomacy and Statecraft, (Sept 2010) 21#3 pp. 416–433.
 Roberts, Nicholas E. "Re‐Remembering the Mandate: Historiographical Debates and Revisionist History in the Study of British Palestine." History Compass 9.3 (2011): 215–230. online.
 Sargent, Andrew. " The British Labour Party and Palestine 1917–1949" (PhD thesis, University of Nottingham, 1980) online 
 Shelef, Nadav G. "From 'Both Banks of the Jordan' to the 'Whole Land of Israel:' Ideological Change in Revisionist Zionism." Israel Studies 9.1 (2004): 125–148. Online 
 Sinanoglou, Penny. "British Plans for the Partition of Palestine, 1929–1938." Historical Journal 52.1 (2009): 131–152. online 
 Wright, Quincy, The Palestine Problem, Political Science Quarterly, 41#3 (1926), pp. 384–412, online .

External links

 
Palestine
British Empire
Former countries in the Middle East
20th century in Jordan
History of Zionism
Political entities in the Land of Israel
1920s in the British Empire
1930s in the British Empire
1940s in the British Empire
1920s establishments in Asia
States and territories established in 1920
States and territories disestablished in 1948
Sykes–Picot Agreement
1948 disestablishments in Asia
1920 establishments in the British Empire
1948 disestablishments in the British Empire
Yishuv during World War II
Mandatory Palestine in World War II